Marat Safin defeated Mark Philippoussis in the final, 3–6, 7–6(9–7), 6–4, 3–6, 7–6(10–8) to win the singles tennis title at the 2000 Paris Masters. With the win, Safin became the world No. 1 for the first time.

Andre Agassi was the reigning champion, but did not participate.

Seeds 
A champion seed is indicated in bold text while text in italics indicates the round in which that seed was eliminated.  All sixteen seeds received a bye into the second round.

Draw

Finals

Top half

Section 1

Section 2

Bottom half

Section 3

Section 4

External links 
 Main draw (ATP)
 Qualifying draw (ATP)
 ITF tournament profile

Singles